UK Rampage was an annual professional wrestling event produced by the World Wrestling Federation (WWF) exclusively for the United Kingdom. With the exception of 1990, it was held from 1989 to 1993. These events aired live on the BSkyB family of cable and satellite channels.

Dates and venues

Results

1989

First WWF UK Event also known as WWF on Sky One was the inaugural UK Rampage event produced by the World Wrestling Federation (WWF). It took place on 10 October 1989 from the London Arena in London, England and aired live on Sky 1. The event marked the WWF's first live event in the United Kingdom.

1991

UK Rampage 1991 was the second UK Rampage event produced by the World Wrestling Federation (WWF). It took place on 24 April 1991 from the London Arena in London, England and aired live on Sky Movies Plus.

1992

UK Rampage 1992 also referred to as European Rampage Again was the third UK Rampage event produced by the World Wrestling Federation (WWF). It took place on 19 April 1992 from the Sheffield Arena in Sheffield, England and aired live on Sky Movies Plus. Some of these matches were shown on Prime Time Wrestling months later.

This event marked the final event of the European Rampage Tour, held in various locations across Europe.

1993

UK Rampage 1993 was the fourth and final UK Rampage event produced by the World Wrestling Federation (WWF). It took place on 11 April 1993 from the Sheffield Arena in Sheffield, England and aired live on Sky Sports. On February 5, 2018 UK Rampage 1993 became available on the WWE Network.

See also

Professional wrestling in the United Kingdom

References

 
Events in London
Professional wrestling in England
1989 in England
1991 in England
1989 in professional wrestling
1991 in professional wrestling
October 1989 events in the United Kingdom
April 1991 events in the United Kingdom
WWE in the United Kingdom